Raineyella antarctica is a Gram-positive, psychrotolerant and motile bacterium from the genus Raineyella which has been isolated from the moss Leptobryum from the shore of Lake Zub in Antarctica.

References

External links
Type strain of Raineyella antarctica at BacDive -  the Bacterial Diversity Metadatabase

Propionibacteriales
Bacteria described in 2016
Psychrophiles